Frederick Lewis Donaldson (7 April 1937 – 24 July 2018) was an English footballer who played as a full-back for Port Vale, Exeter City, Chester, Macclesfield Town and Stafford Rangers. He won the Fourth Division title with Port Vale in 1958–59.

Career

Port Vale
Donaldson was born in Stoke-on-Trent graduated through the junior squad at local club Port Vale to sign first-team forms in July 1954. He made his senior debut on 4 May 1955, in a 1–0 win over Lincoln City at Sincil Bank on the last day of the 1954–55 season. However, he had to wait until the start of the 1957–58 campaign before he played another game; by this time the "Valiants" had been relegated from the Second Division to the Third Division South, and Norman Low had replaced Freddie Steele as manager. Donaldson played 27 league games at right-back throughout the campaign, but featured only 11 times in the 1958–59 season as Vale won the Fourth Division title. He featured just eight times in the Third Division in the 1959–60 season, but claimed four goals against Colchester United, Accrington Stanley (2), and Newport County. He left Vale Park in August 1960, when he was sold to Exeter City for a £2,000 fee.

Later career
Donaldson made his debut for the "Grecians" in a 0–0 draw with Carlisle United at St James Park on the opening day of the 1960–61 season. He went on to score six goals in 36 Fourth Division games as Glen Wilson's finished 21st in the Fourth Division, before departing at the end of the campaign after remaining on the transfer-list for four months. He then played 20 Fourth Division games for Chester in the 1961–62 campaign, as the "Seals" finished bottom of the English Football League. He then left the Deva Stadium, and later played for Cheshire County League sides Macclesfield Town and Stafford Rangers.

Later life
Donaldson became a sales rep after retiring as a player, selling carpets and floorings. He married Iris and had two children in Linda and David. He remained a keen crown green bowler from his teenage years up until his death following a short illness on 24 July 2018.

Style of play
Port Vale teammate Colin Askey described Donaldson as "a nice footballer, someone who liked to get the ball down and play", able to play in various positions from his preferred spot at right-back as well as inside-forward and right-half.

Career statistics
Source:

Honours
Port Vale
Football League Fourth Division: 1958–59

References

1937 births
2018 deaths
Footballers from Stoke-on-Trent
English footballers
Association football fullbacks
Association football wing halves
Association football inside forwards
Port Vale F.C. players
Exeter City F.C. players
Chester City F.C. players
Macclesfield Town F.C. players
Stafford Rangers F.C. players
English Football League players